Twicket (a portmanteau of Twitter and Cricket) was a village cricket match, streamed world-wide on the Internet on Easter Monday, 25 April 2011, with the intention of highlighting the need for high-capacity upstream broadband to enable community content provision. This innovative exercise—claimed to be a world first—caught media attention, making BBC television news, BBC Radio London, TalkSport, Radio New Zealand; and being written about by The Guardian, The Observer and Metro and mentioned on Twitter by Stephen Fry, the BBC's Rory Cellan-Jones and Jonathan Agnew (BBC cricket correspondent).

Background 

The event was conceived by consultant John Popham after seeing two comments on Twitter; in the first Dan Slee expressed his hopes for keeping up with a local village cricket team via Twitter. Then, Chris Conder (@cyberdoyle) mentioned that she was testing a new 30 Mbps, symmetrical internet connection, recently installed by Lancaster University in her village, Wray, in Lancashire, England, one of only three villages in the UK to have a symmetrical community network.

On learning from Conder that Wray was to hold a special cricket match part of the village's annual Scarecrow Festival, billed as Wray vs. the Rest of the World, Popham decided to broadcast it to the world to demonstrate the potential of high-speed synchronous broadband. He explained:

In a retrospective blog post, he explained:

The match
The match was 20 overs per side (the Twenty20 format), with any batsman reaching 20 runs required to retire. Wray won the toss, and elected to bowl first. After 20 overs, The Rest of the World were 69 for 5, leaving Wray needing 70 runs off 20 overs, which they achieved with a final six, in their eleventh over, winning by 8 wickets.

The post-match tug o'war contest (won by Rest of World, 2 out of 3) was also streamed live, as were interviews with various participants.

Media 

The event was streamed online on Bambuser with technical support from Birmingham company Aquila TV who used two Sony Z1 cameras and a DSR 350. The stream was watched by a peak of 2,733 viewers. A separate audio commentary was broadcast on-line, by Radio Youthology, attracting 1,780 listeners; their highest figure ever.

Also attending were a BBC North West television news crew, whose film was broadcast the same evening.

The related hashtag #twicket was trending on Twitter shortly before the end of the match.
The match also made a star out of local commenter, Brenda, who drank Pimm's throughout the game.

References

External links 
 
 
The Story of #Twicket – Popham's post-event round-up.
Popham interview on BBC Radio Lancaster
BBC North West news feature, extracted to Vimeo

Cricket matches
Sport in Lancashire
Community organizing
Internet-based activism
Internet-related activism
2011 in England
2011 in cricket
Stephen Fry